Ishar Singh (1858 – 12 September 1897),  was an Indian-Sikh Havildar and war hero of the 36th Sikhs. He was known leading the regiment on a last stand against the 10-12,000 strong Pashtun tribesmen with only 20 other men at the Battle of Saragarhi. After sustaining enough resistance, Singh was fighting alone but refused to surrender and fought to the death along with the rest.

Early military career
He was born in 1858 at Jagraon, Punjab into the agrarian family of Sardar Dulla Singh, hailing from Ludhiana. Singh had an aspiration for becoming a soldier and when he turned 18, he joined the Punjab Frontier Force. He was initially assigned to Regiment No. 165 of the Regiment before being drafted in the 36th Sikhs Regiment in 1887. Major General James Lunt described him as:

Battle of Saragarhi

Despite initial British success within the Samana Range, the Pashtuns continued to harass the British forces. Near the area stood Fort Lockhart and Fort Gulistan but both weren't visible due to the mountainous terrain. As a result, the Saragarhi outpost was established to give easier communications between the two forts but after the Pashtuns allied with the Afridis, the outpost became endangered from local uprisings which combined to a force of 10,000 to 12,000. 

By this point, Singh was in his early 40s, given full command of Saragarhi and was married but had no children. With the small garrison consisting of 2 other senior officers and 18 soldiers, all 20 men led by Singh fought to the death. With no water or food, the Sikhs fought for 8 hours, managing to kill 4-500 men with each Sikh killing at least 20 Pashtuns before they all were killed in the battle.

Legacy
In recognition of their supreme sacrifice, the British Parliament rose to pay them respect, and each one of them was posthumously awarded the Indian Order of Merit and the Indian Distinguished Service Medal. The service of the 36th Sikh has been memorialized by the Sikh as the day of the battle, September 12th, is celebrated as "Saragarhi Day". Singh was portrayed by Akshay Kumar in the 2019 film Kesari. He was also portrayed by Randeep Hooda for the book cover of The 36th Sikhs in the Tirah Campaign 1897-98 – Saragarhi and the defence of the Samana forts by Amarinder Singh. On September 12, 2021, a statue of Singh was erected at Wolverhampton, West Midlands to commemorate the 124th anniversary of the battle.

References

1850s births
1897 deaths
Sikh warriors
British Indian Army personnel killed in action
Military personnel from Punjab, India